Isaac ben Moses Rumsch (April 6, 1822 – August 21, 1894) was a Lithuanian Hebrew writer, translator, and educator.

Biography

Isaac Rumsch was born in the village of Zezemer. At the age of nine he went to Vilna, where he studied the Talmud in the yeshiva of his brother Joseph Rumsch, and then in that of Rabbi . Subsequently he acquired a knowledge of German and other secular subjects; but his plan of going to Germany to obtain a scientific education was frustrated by his disapproving relatives. When in 1853 the Russian government opened public schools for Jewish children in the government of Vilna, he, together with his friend Judah Löb Gordon, was appointed a teacher in the school of Ponevyezh.

Besides numerous novels, he contributed articles to Ha-Karmel and Ha-Melitz and left in manuscript some Hebrew stories and notes on the Bible.

Publications
  A free Hebrew translation of Robinson Crusoe from the German of Franz Rauch.
  Critical glosses on 's Russian translation of the Psalms, together with notes on some of them.
  A story of Jewish life, published alongside the Hebrew novel Ḥatikhat bad.
  A historical novel of Esterka, the mistress Polish king Casimir the Great.
  A historical novel of Jewish life in Spain in the fourteenth century, freely translated from Ludwig Philippson.

References

External links
 Works by Rumsch at the National Library of Israel

1822 births
1894 deaths
19th-century Lithuanian educators
19th-century Lithuanian Jews
19th-century Lithuanian writers
German–Hebrew translators
Jewish educators
Jewish translators
People from Vilna Governorate
People of the Haskalah